The French Athletics Championships is a series of annual outdoor competition in the sport of athletics, organised by the Fédération française d'athlétisme (FFA; French Athletics Federation), which serve as the French national championships. The winners of the events are typically French nationals, though foreign athletes have also won at the championships, typically competing through invitation or as a foreign athlete based at an athletics club in France. Most typical is the presence of African athletes from the Françafrique region.

Men

100 metres

200 metres

400 metres

800 metres

1500 metres

5000 metres

10,000 metres

Marathon

3000 metres steeplechase

110 metres hurdles

400 metres hurdles

High jump

Pole vault

Long jump

Triple jump

Shot put

Discus throw

Hammer throw

Javelin throw

Decathlon

20 kilometres walk
Prior to 1966, there were two French championships in the 20 km: one held on roads by the French Athletics Federation and another held on tracks by the Union Française de Marche (French Walking Union). Since then the championship has mostly been a road one, bar a period as a track walk from 1977 to 1988, plus a 1995 track championship.

50 kilometres walk
Prior to 1965, there were two French championships in the 50 km: one held by the French Athletics Federation and another held by the Union Française de Marche (French Walking Union). Both championships were held on the road, bar a one-off 50 km track walk in 1981.

Cross country (long)

Cross country (short)

Mountain running

10K run

Half marathon

25K

100K run

24-hour run
The French Championships in 24-hour run was held twice in 2005.

Women

100 metres

200 metres

400 metres

800 metres

1500 metres

3000 metres
The 3000 metres was replaced as the standard shortest women's long-distance track event by the 5000 metres in 1995.

5000 metres

10,000 metres

10K run

Half marathon

25K run
The 25K run was replaced by the half marathon in 1992. The 1990 championship course was short of the full distance by 515 metres.

Marathon

100K run

24-hour run

3000 metres steeplechase

80 metres hurdles
The 80 metres hurdles was replaced as the standard women's sprint hurdles event by the 100 metres hurdles in 1969.

100 metres hurdles

400 metres hurdles

High jump

Pole vault

Long jump

Triple jump

Shot put

Discus throw

Hammer throw

Javelin throw

Pentathlon
The pentathlon was replaced as the standard women's combined event by the heptathlon in 1980.

Heptathlon

5000 metres track walk
From 1973 to 1976, the women's 5000 metres walk did not have sanction as an official French Championship race.

10 kilometres walk
From 1979 to 1982, and after 2003, the women's 10 kilometres walk did not have sanction as an official French Championship race. The 2004 event was held over 20 kilometres (which later became the standard distance for women). The event was contested on the track from 1979 to 1989, plus 1995 and 1999.

20 kilometres walk
The women's 20 kilometres walk championship is typically held on road circuits, but was held as a track walk for the 2003 edition.

Cross country (long)

Cross country (short)

Mountain running

References

Champions 1960–2006
French Championships. GBR Athletics. Retrieved 2021-01-11.

Winners
 List
French Championships
Athletics